Tonicha (born Antónia de Jesus Montes Tonicha on 8 March 1946) is a Portuguese pop-folk singer. She represented Portugal in the Eurovision Song Contest 1971, with the song "Menina do alto da serra" ("Girl from the country mountain"); she finished ninth. She also represented her country in the OTI Festival 1972 in which she had better luck and finished sixth.

Discography

Vários-Fala do Homem Nascido (Orfeu, 1972)
(LP, 1972)
Folclore (LP, Orfeu, 1973) SB-1066
As Duas Faces de Tonicha (LP, Zip-Zip, 1974)
Canções de Abril (conjunto e coros) (LP, Discófilo, 1975)
Conjunto e Coros (Lp, Orfeu, 1975)
Cantigas do meu País (LP, Orfeu, 1975)
As Duas Faces de Tonicha (LP, Orfeu, 1975)
Cantigas Populares (LP, Orfeu, 1976) SB-1088
Cantigas Duma Terra À Beira Mar (LP, Polygram, 1977)
Ela Por Ela (LP, Polygram, 1980) – reeditado em 1996
Foliada Portuguesa (LP, Polygram, 1983)
Regresso (CD, Polygram, 1993)
Canções d' Aquém e D'Além Tejo (CD, Polygram, 1995)
Mulher (CD, Polygram, 1997)
Canções Para Os Meus Netos (CD, Universal, 2008)
Cantos da Vida – Colecção Vida (CD, Farol, 2008)
Os Maiores Sucessos- vol. I (RCA, 1970)
Os Maiores Sucessos de Tonicha – Vol.II (RCA, 1970)
Os Maiores Sucessos (LP, Polygram, 1981)
A Arte e a Música de Tonicha (2LP, Polygram, 1985)
Sucessos Populares (LP, Polygram, 1987)
A Arte e a Música de Tonicha (2LP, Polygram, 1989)
Os Maiores Sucessos (CD, Polygram, 1990)
O Melhor dos Melhores (CD, Movieplay, 1994)
Coração Português (CD, Polygram, 1999)
O Melhor de 2 Tonicha/Trio Odemira (2CD, Universal, 2001)
Antologia 1971–1977 (2CD, Movieplay, 2004)
A Arte e a Música (CD, Universal, 2004)
Antologia 77–97 (CD, Universal, 2007)

Singles and EPs

RCA/TELECTRA [1964/1970]

Luar Para Esta Noite (RCA, 1964)[-LUAR PARA ESTA NOITE/SÓ EU/CANÇÃO DE SER TRISTE/ENFIM]
Boca de Amora (RCA, 1966) TP-290
O Que Foste E Já Não És (EP, Rca, 1966)
A Tua Canção Avózinha (EP, RCA, 1967)
Tonicha volta a cantar Damas/Paião (RCA, 1967)
Calendário (RCA, 1968) TP-372
Fui ter Com a Madrugada (RCA, 1968) TP-373
Canta José cid (1968) [La Mansarde/Emporte-Moi/Loin d'Ici]
Caminheiro, Donde Vens? – 1969 [RCA TP-445] Caminheiro, Donde Vens?/Terra Sonhada/Amanhã/Canção Para um Regresso
Modas do Ribatejo [RCA TP-473, 1969)] [Vira dos Malmequeres/Moda das Carreirinhas/Erva Cidreira/Vira da Rapioca]
Modas do Alentejo (RCA TP-497)[Rapsódia de cantares alentejanos/Primavera das lindas flores/Maria Rita, cara bonita/Com que letra se escreve Maria]
Foclore de Portugal [RCA TP-515] [Senhora do Almortão/Pesinho Do Pico/Resineiro/Lirio Branco]
D. Pedro (EP, RCA, 1969) TP-530 [D.Pedro (Que Volta Da Pinga)/Balada da Rotina Diária/O Meu País/Livre]
Canta Foclore de Portugal [RCA TP-562] [Vai de Ruz Truz Truz/Coradinhas/La-Ri-Ló-Lé/Trovas Minhotas]

ZIP-ZIP [1971/1972]

Menina do Alto da Serra/Mulher (Single, Zip-Zip, 1971) – Zip – 30014/S
Poema Pena (EP, Zip-Zip, 1972) Poema Pena/Rosa de Barro/Manhã Clara- Zip 10034/E

MOVIEPLAY [1972]

Menina (do Alto da Serra)/Mulher é Força (Single, Movieplay, 1971) SP – 20.021
4 Canções de Patxi Andion (EP, Movieplay, 1972)
Poema desde Lejos/20 Versos A Mi Muerte (Single, Movieplay, 1972)

ORFEU [1972/1973]

Glória, Glória, Aleluia/Lisboa Perto e Longe (1972) Orfeu Sat 845
Parole, Parole [com João Perry]/Simplesmente Maria (Orfeu, 1972)
A Rapariga e o Poeta (EP, Orfeu, 1973) [A Rapariga e o Poeta/Com Um Cravo Na Boca/Contraluz/Rosa, Rosa]- ATEP 6467
Folclore (EP, 1973) Farrapeirinha/Os Bravos/Malhão De Águeda/Dança Daí – Atep 6500
Batatinhas (EP, Orfeu, 1973)-Atep 6541-Batatinhas/Senhor Padre Valentim/Vira Do Vinho/Passarinho Trigueiro

ZIP-ZIP [1974]

Portugal Ressuscitado/Canção Combate (EP, Zip-Zip, 1974) – InClave/Tonicha/Fernando Tordo – Zip 30052/S
Obrigado Soldadinho/Já chegou a Liberdade (Single, Zip-Zip, 1974) – Zip – 30053/S
O Preto No Branco/Tanto Me Faz (Single, Zip-Zip, 1974) – Zip – 30056/S
Canto da Primavera/Os Novos Pobres (Single, Zip-Zip, 1974) – Zip – 30061/S
Folclore (Single, Zip-zip, 1974)

DISCOFILO [1975]

O Povo Em Marcha/Cravos da Madrugada (Discófilo, 1975) 1001
Bandeira da Vitória/Cantaremos-Lutaremos (Single, Discófilo, 1975) 1008
Terras de Garcia Lorca/Paìs irmão (Single, Discófilo, 1975)
Folclore (EP, Discófilo)Isto agora Vai Ou Racha
Folclore (EP, Discófilo) [Ribeira Cheia/Barquinha Feiticeira/Vida Militar/Cantiga do Rei]

ORFEU [1975/1976]

conjunto e coros-1 (Ep, Orfeu, 1975) Terras de Garcia Lorca/Paìs irmão/O povo em marcha/Cravos da madrugada
Folclore 1 – Cantigas do Meu País (Single, Orfeu, 1975)-atep6683-Fadinho do Pobre/Barquinha Feiticeira/Cantiga do Rei/Vida Militar
Folclore 2(EP, 1975)Compadre Partidário/Serrana Povo/Isto Agora Vai Ou Racha/Barqueiros do Povo – Atep 6684–6685
Folclore 3 – Cantigas do Meu País (EP, Orfeu, 1975) A Moda da Saia Curta
Cantaremos/Lutaremos (conjunto e coros-2) (Ep, Orfeu, 1975)Cantaremos-Lutaremos/Somos Livres/Bandeira da Vitória/Hino do Trabalho – Atep 6696
Cantigas Populares 1 (Orfeu, 1975) – Atep 6698 – Minha Mãe, Minha Mãe/Entrudo/Milho Verde
Cantigas Populares 2 (Orfeu, 1975) – Atep 6699 – O Meu Bem/Charamba/Roseira Brava/Samacaio
Cantigas Populares 3 (Orfeu, 1975) – Atep 6700 – Olhos pretos/Menina Florentina/Cantigas do Maio
Farrapeira/S. João/Fado/Poveirinha (EP, Orfeu, 1976)

POLYGRAM [1976–]

O Menino/Um Grande Amor (Single, Polygram, 1976) – 2063015
Marcha da Mouraria/Marcha de Benfica (Single, Polygram, 1977) – 2063022
Tu És o Zé Que Fumas/Cana Verde (Single, Polygram, 1977) – 2063027
Quem Te Quer Bem, Meu Bem/Um Dia Uma Flor (Single, Polygram, 1978) – 2063032
Pestotira/Vira da Desgarrada (Single, Polygram, 1978) – 2063033
Canção da Amizade/É Tarde Meu Amor (Single, Polygram, 1978) – 2063036
Zumba Na Caneca (Single, Polygram, 1978) – 2063039
O Gaiteiro Português/Sericotalho, Bacalhau. Azeite e Alho (Single, Polygram, 1979)- 2063045
O Chico Pinguinhas/Quadrilha de Cinfães (Single, Polygram, 1979) – 2063050
Canção da Alegria/Canção Sem Ti (Single, Polygram, 1981) – 6063061 –
Fadinho da Comida (Single, Polygram, 1981)
Pulguinhas (Single, Polygram, 1982)
Todos Me Querem/O Mar Enrola NA Areia (Single, Polygram, 1983) 8134197
Pinga Amor/Canção do Futebol (Single, Polygram, 1984) – 881049
Esta Festa Portuguesa (Single, Polygram, 1985)
Fátima Altar do Mundo (A 13 de Maio/Avé Maria de Shubert) (Single, Polygram, 1987)

References

External links

1946 births
Living people
People from Beja, Portugal
Eurovision Song Contest entrants of 1971
Eurovision Song Contest entrants for Portugal
20th-century Portuguese women singers
21st-century Portuguese women singers